ČT HD was the high-definition TV channel from Czech Television. ČT HD broadcast programming from ČT1, ČT2 and ČT4, via IPTV, digital terrestrial (in several areas only) and satellite (via Astra 1E – DVB-S standard, since spring 2010 via the new Astra 3B – DVB-S2 standard).

External links
 Website (in Czech)

Television stations in the Czech Republic
Television channels and stations established in 2009
Czech Television